Spur (1913–1930) was an American thoroughbred racehorse.

Racing career
In 1916, he won eight major races and finished second in the Belmont Stakes. At age four, he equaled the Empire City track record for a mile and a sixteenth on the dirt in winning his second straight Yonkers Handicap.

Stud record
As a sire, standing at James Butler's Eastview Farm in Tarrytown, New York, Spur's best progeny was Sting.

Spur died on May 31, 1930 at Eastview Farm.

Pedigree

References

External links 
 Spur's pedigree and partial racing stats

1913 racehorse births
1930 racehorse deaths
Racehorses bred in Virginia
Racehorses trained in the United States
Thoroughbred family 2-h